Phyllis M. Faber is an American botanist who did extensive work organizing and promoting the California Native Plant Society. 
She was editor of Fremontia: A Journal of the California Native Plant Society for 16 years, from 1983 to 1999. It was said of her that, "Phyllis came to be synonymous with CNPS (California Native Plant Society) publications". She was named a Fellow of the California Native Plant Society (CNPS). She was credited with significant contributions to and successes of CNPS, including raising the botanical literacy of elected officials in California, promoting preservation of native plants through legislation and policies of public agencies, and making closer associations between CNPS and universities.

She served on the California Coastal Commission, Boards of Directors of the Planning and Conservation League, the League for Coastal Protection, and Marin Agricultural Land Trust, which she founded.

References

Living people
21st-century American botanists
Year of birth missing (living people)